The 2004 United States Senate election in Kentucky took place on November 2, 2004 alongside other elections to the United States Senate in other states as well as elections to the United States House of Representatives and various state and local elections. Incumbent Republican U.S. Senator Jim Bunning narrowly won re-election to a second term over Democratic State Senator Daniel Mongiardo.

Democratic primary

Background 
Former Governor Paul E. Patton was considered the initial frontrunner in the Democratic primary, but he opted not to run due to a scandal over an extramarital affair. Eventually, the Democrats settled on Daniel Mongiardo, a relatively unknown doctor and State Senator from Hazard, Kentucky.

Candidates 
 Daniel Mongiardo, Kentucky State Senator
 David Lynn Williams, perennial candidate

Results

Republican primary

Candidates 
 Jim Bunning, incumbent U.S. Senator
 Barry Metcalf, Kentucky State Senator

Results

General election

Candidates 
 Jim Bunning (R), incumbent U.S. Senator
 Daniel Mongiardo (D), State Senator

Campaign 

During his reelection bid in 2004, controversy erupted when Bunning described Mongiardo as looking "like one of Saddam Hussein's sons." Bunning apologized, then later went on to declare that Mongiardo's "thugs" had assaulted his wife.

Bunning had an estimated $4 million campaign war chest, while Mongiardo had only $600,000. The Democrats began increasing financial support to Mongiardo when it became apparent that Bunning's bizarre behavior was costing him votes, purchasing more than $800,000 worth of additional television airtime on his behalf.

The November 2 election was one of the closest in Kentucky history. The race turned out to be very close, with Mongiardo leading with as many as 80% of the returns coming in. However, Bunning eventually won by just over one percentage point after the western portion of the state, which is on Central Time, broke heavily for him. Some analysts felt that because of President George W. Bush's 20% margin of victory in the state, Bunning was able to effectively ride the President's coattails to victory.

Predictions

Polling

Results

Overall

By county

See also 
 2004 United States Senate elections

Notes

References

External links
Official campaign websites (Archived)
Daniel Mongiardo

2004 Kentucky elections
Kentucky
2004